Walter Leslie Raby (23 September 1902 – 9 March 1973) was an English professional footballer who played as an inside forward.

References

1902 births
1973 deaths
People from Lincoln, England
English footballers
Association football inside forwards
Robeys F.C. players
Lincoln City F.C. players
Grantham Town F.C. players
Grimsby Town F.C. players
Leyton Orient F.C. players
Scunthorpe United F.C. players
Gainsborough Trinity F.C. players
Poole Town F.C. players
Doncaster Rovers F.C. players
English Football League players